Emory & Henry College (E&H or Emory) is a private liberal arts college in Emory, Virginia. The campus comprises  of Washington County, which is part of the Appalachian highlands of Southwest Virginia. Founded in 1836, Emory & Henry College is the oldest institution of higher learning in Southwest Virginia.

History 

Emory & Henry College is named after John Emory, a renowned Methodist bishop, and Patrick Henry, an American patriot and Virginia's first governor, though some research suggests the name honors Henry's sister Elizabeth Henry Campbell Russell, who lived in nearby Saltville and Chilhowie. The college was founded upon the principles of vital faith and civic engagement by Creed Fulton, a Methodist minister; Colonel William Byars; Tobias Smyth, a Methodist farmer; and Alexander Findlay, a Methodist businessman.

The foundation for Wiley Hall was laid on September 30, 1836. The Board of Trustees hired Charles Collins (1838–1852) as the institution's first president, with classes beginning in the spring of 1838, with 60 students enrolled.

The college closed in April 1861 during the Civil War and was commandeered by the Confederate States of America in 1862, operating as a hospital until 1865.  During this time the campus saw battle during the Battle of Saltville. The hospital was the setting of Lieutenant Smith's murder on October 7, 1864, by Champ Ferguson. After the war ended, the college reopened.

The administrative operation of Martha Washington College, a Methodist-affiliated school for women located in Abingdon, Virginia, was merged with that of Emory & Henry College in 1918. At its November 1918 session held in Johnson City, Tennessee, the Holston Conference of the Methodist Episcopal Church, South, decided to merge Martha Washington College with Emory & Henry College; all of the property of Martha Washington, including its 8-acre Abingdon campus, would be transferred to Emory & Henry in exchange for Emory & Henry assuming the debts of Martha Washington and operating Martha Washington College as a "co-ordinate woman's college". This arrangement lasted for about a decade, until Martha Washington College completely closed in 1931.

During World War II, Emory & Henry was one of 131 US colleges and universities that took part in the V-12 Navy College Training Program which offered students a path to a Navy commission.

Today, the college comprises a student body population of approximately 1,100 and employs 65 full-time professors.

Campus 
Located in the Virginia Highlands, the Emory & Henry central campus encompasses  and is surrounded by an additional 167 undeveloped acres in the village of Emory. The entire central campus is listed on the National Register of Historic Places and the Virginia Register of Historic Landmarks.

Buildings 
With many campus buildings dating from the mid-19th century, several major academic buildings are part of a historic district that is listed on the National Register of Historic Places, including Wiley Hall, which was built 1838 and was used as a Confederate hospital during the Civil War. In recent years, Emory & Henry has experienced a building boom, most notably with the construction of the James H. Brooks Field House, a major expansion of Byars Hall, and the construction of the Woodrow W. McGlothlin Center for the Arts.

Residence halls

Emory & Henry boasts modern and newly renovated campus housing. Among the residence halls are the newly built Elm and Hickory halls, which feature double occupancy rooms, each with its own bathroom. In the Emory "village" students enjoy Prillaman and Linden houses, modern residences that feature single and double occupancy rooms in a home-like setting. Other residence halls include Stuart Hall, Martha Washington Hall and Hillman Hall.

Academics

Academic buildings include McGlothlin-Street Hall which includes Emory & Henry's science programs as well as programs in education, political science, business and history. Historic Byars Hall was recently expanded to include classrooms, rehearsal spaces and office space for the Division of Visual and Performing Arts. The Hermesian and Calliopean rooms, which are home to the college's historic debate societies, have been restored to their early elegance. Students also attend classes on the main E&H campus in the Creed Fulton Observatory, Miller Hall and Wiley Hall.

Other buildings

Other campus buildings include Memorial Chapel, Kelly Library, the King Athletic Center, Brook Field House, Martin-Brock Student Center, Van Dyke, Emily Williams House, and Tobias-Smyth Cabin (a reconstructed log house which was home to one of the college's founders; now a museum and meeting place).

Academics 
Emory & Henry College's liberal arts academic program is based upon a required four-year core curriculum of history, literature, and culture. The college has more than 25 academic programs of study, offers more than 50 bachelor degrees, and offers master's degrees in education and community and organizational leadership. The college's programs in public policy and community service and international studies have been nationally recognized.

Students have the opportunity to study abroad or travel abroad with professors. They may attend a range of lectures and cultural events, called Lyceums, led by political figures, area experts, or artists.

Civic Engagement

Emory & Henry has a long legacy of commitment to civic engagement. Students are involved in a wide range of long-term, meaningful projects in partnership with a variety of community groups and organizations. The college has a unique undergraduate program in Civic Innovation that is centered around a project-based curriculum related to issues of citizenship, social change, and public activism. This program is based in the nationally recognized Appalachian Center for Civic Life, which also oversees the Bonner Scholars program and the Civic Leaders Scholars program.

Student research

E&H professors prepare students by providing research opportunities. Students studying biology might collect microbes  under water. Physics majors could find themselves photographing binary stars. Students doing research for a political science class might present their work to a major conferences such as the Western Political Science Association.

Study abroad

The International Education and Study Abroad Program is an important part of the liberal arts curriculum. In a partnership with CIEE, students have spent semesters or summers abroad, or participated in Emory abroad courses — short-term international programs led by the E&H faculty. Through active engagement, the program enhances global awareness through an understanding of cultural diversity and global interdependence.

Lyceum

Each year, Emory and Henry holds close to 100 concerts, lectures, theatre performances, dance performances, films, exhibits, and poetry readings to complete the academic experience. Of the lyceum events, the biggest are a literary festival each November and a Spring Forum focused on a particular social issue.

Outdoor program

The college is located in the Appalachian Mountains with forests to hike, mountains for cross-country skiing, creeks to paddle, cliffs for rappelling, and caves for spelunking. The Appalachian and Iron Mountain Trails, the Virginia Creeper Trail, the Mount Rogers National Recreation Area, the Jefferson and George Washington National Forests, and the New, Nantahala, and Clinch rivers are all close by.

Athletics 

Emory and Henry College's sports teams, nicknamed the "Wasps," participate in NCAA Division II in the South Atlantic Conference (SAC).  The college fields men's teams in football, soccer, basketball, baseball, cross country and tennis, and women's teams in cross country, volleyball, basketball, softball, soccer, tennis and swimming.

Mascot 
The official Emory & Henry mascot is the Wasp.  While there are many rumored origins of the nickname, the most commonly accepted story is that Emory & Henry was first called the Wasps after the football team played its first game in Neyland Stadium at the University of Tennessee.  Although Emory & Henry was beaten 27–0, Emory & Henry held the Volunteers scoreless for the first half.  Legend has it that the local paper declared that "those Virginia boys stung like wasps."

Student activities 
There are more than 70 student organizations active on Emory and Henry's campus. Community service projects are also a way that many students, especially Bonner Scholars, spend their free time. Often students mountain bike or hike on the numerous trails in nearby Damascus or Abingdon, or participate in rock climbing, kayaking or other outdoor sports. Sports such as football, basketball, soccer, baseball, and volleyball are offered as both intercollegiate and intramural sports.

Greek life
Emory and Henry allows both local and national social fraternities and sororities, but currently only local organizations exist on campus.

The currently recognized social sororities on campus are Alpha Beta Chi, Delta Omicron Pi, Delta Rho Delta, Kappa Phi Alpha, Pi Sigma Kappa, Sigma Upsilon Nu, and Zeta Phi.

The currently recognized social fraternities on campus are Beta Lambda Zeta, C Phi C, Dom-I-Necher, Phi Gamma Phi, Phi Pi Alpha, Pi Delta Chi, Sigma Alpha Kappa, Sigma Iota, and Theta Chi Epsilon.

Student media
 The Whitetopper student newspaper, established in 1921
 EHC-TV, student produced television news program
 WEHC-FM 90.7, the college's official radio station

Traditions
Traditions at Emory and Henry College include:

Service Plunge – the college's annual "Service Plunge" is a tradition and a requirement of all incoming freshmen in which they perform community service for a day during the first month of school (usually a Saturday).

Running of the Bulls – The Running of the Bulls is a bi-annual event in which girls who are pledging a sorority are sent running out of the front door of Wiley-Jackson (MaWa) and are told to run towards the sorority which they intend to pledge. The event, although short, is often attended by much of the student population due to its humorous nature.

The Rock – Every athletic team that plays their games at Fred Selfe Stadium touches a giant rock taken from the late Fred Selfe's hometown. Coach Selfe was a long-time assistant coach for the Emory and Henry football team who died of cancer and whose saying "Trust in your teammates, trust in yourself" is painted in the football locker room.  Touching the Rock is seen as not only a unifying gesture, but it is supposed to also be a "recognition of all those who wore the blue and gold before you."

The Duck Pond – Emory and Henry is known for having ducks year round at its duck pond.  This is because the pond is naturally heated due to a spring (which can be seen in the corner closest to Wiley Hall in the foundations of the old well house).

Rankings and recognition 
E&H was honored by President Obama with the Corporation for National and Community Service Presidential Award in March 2010, making it the first Virginia institution for higher learning to receive the award.

Notable alumni

Literature, television and arts
 J. Fred Essary (1903) – journalist
 Kermit Hunter (Re-1931) –  playwright and English professor
 Samuel W. Small (1871) – journalist, evangelist, prohibitionist

Education
 Henry DeLamar Clayton – President of the University of Alabama from 1886 to 1889; Confederate general during Civil War
 Joe L. Kincheloe (1972) – author on education, culture, and politics

Military
 James Patton Brownlow – Brevet Brigadier General of the 1st Tennessee Volunteer Cavalry Regiment (Union) during the Civil War
 Thomas T. Handy (enrolled 1908–1911) – Deputy Chief of Staff of the US Army in World War II; signed the orders to drop the atomic bomb on Hiroshima
 Frank Rowlett (1929) – cryptologist who cracked the Japanese code during World War II
 Robert G. Shaver – lawyer, Confederate States Army colonel, and Ku Klux Klan leader.
 J.E.B. Stuart (enrolled 1848–1850) – US Army officer and later a Confederate general during the Civil War

Science, research, and medicine
 John Young (1955) – Naval officer and NASA astronaut who was the ninth man to walk on the moon
 J.B. Wolfe – Academic Psychologist and Behavioral Scientist PhD; chair of the Department Of Psychology at the University of Mississippi for 30 years

Politics and government
 Toni Atkins (1984) – former Speaker and current majority leader of the California State Assembly; former acting mayor of San Diego
 Henry Bowen – elected to the Virginia House of Delegates from 1869 to 1873; served two terms in the US House of Representatives
 B. B. Comer (1869) – Governor of Alabama from 1907 to 1911
 John M. Fleming (1851) – Tennessee state legislator and newspaper editor
 John Goode (1848) – Virginia Congressman, Solicitor General of the U.S.
 Morgan Griffith (1980) – elected to the US House of Representatives in 2011 and serves Virginia's 9th Congressional District; served in the Virginia House of Delegates from 1994 to 2011 and was elected House Majority Leader; first Republican in Virginia history to hold that position 
 Joseph P. Johnson (1952) – served in the Virginia House of Delegates from 1966 to 1970; and again from 1990 to 2014
 George C. Peery (1894) – Governor of Virginia from 1934 to 1938
 Harley Orrin Staggers (1931) – US Congressman from 1949 to 1981; represented West Virginia's 2nd Congressional District for 32 years
 Henry Carter Stuart (1874) – Governor of Virginia from 1914 to 1918

Business
 Harold Arthur Poling (1940s) – CEO and Chairman of the Ford Motor Company from 1990 to 1993
 Richard Joshua Reynolds (enrolled 1868–1870) – founder of R.J. Reynolds Tobacco Company

Sports and athletics
 Larry Bales (1968) – former football and baseball college coach
 Glenn Roberts (1930s) – credited as the originator of the modern-day jumpshot in basketball; All-American; scored over 2,000 career points
 Sonny Wade (1969) – 1968 All-American quarterback; drafted by the Philadelphia Eagles in 1969; later played for the Alouettes in the CFL; Grey Cup champion
 Montie Weaver (1927) – pitched for the Washington Senators and the Boston Red Sox from 1931 to 1939
 Mike Young (1986) – Division I college basketball Head Coach at Virginia Tech

References

External links

 

 
Private universities and colleges in Virginia
Educational institutions established in 1836
1836 establishments in Virginia
University and college buildings on the National Register of Historic Places in Virginia
Historic districts on the National Register of Historic Places in Virginia
National Register of Historic Places in Washington County, Virginia
Education in Washington County, Virginia
Universities and colleges accredited by the Southern Association of Colleges and Schools
Buildings and structures in Washington County, Virginia
Tourist attractions in Washington County, Virginia
Universities and colleges affiliated with the Methodist Episcopal Church